Tarasovo is a rural locality (a village) in Terebayevskoye Rural Settlement, Nikolsky District, Vologda Oblast, Russia. The population was 153 as of 2002.

Geography 
Tarasovo is located 24 km northwest of Nikolsk (the district's administrative centre) by road. Terebayevo is the nearest rural locality.

References 

Rural localities in Nikolsky District, Vologda Oblast